"Never Forget You" is a song by Swedish singer Zara Larsson and British singer and songwriter MNEK. The song was released in the United Kingdom on 22 July 2015 as a digital download, as the second single from her second studio album So Good. The song reached number one in Larsson's home country as well as the top ten in eight additional countries, and became both Larsson and MNEK's first US entry on the Billboard Hot 100, peaking at number 13 in May 2016 and becoming the best rank on the chart for both artists. The single is certified Platinum or higher in sixteen countries. An orchestral version of the song would later be released on 21 May 2021 as a track off the Summer edition of her third studio album Poster Girl.

Music video
A music video to accompany the release of "Never Forget You" was released onto Larsson's official Vevo account on 17 September 2015. It features a girl who meets a creature, or makes up an imaginary friend (a large, friendly beast covered in shaggy black hair). It shows the girl growing up and always thinking about and spending time with the creature, or imaginary friend (played by Chris Fleming). The video was filmed in Iceland and was directed by Richard Paris Wilson.

Track listing

Chart performance

Weekly charts

Year-end charts

Decade-end charts

Certifications

Release history

Cover versions
It was covered by the metalcore band Our Last Night.

References

External links

2015 singles
MNEK songs
Zara Larsson songs
Virgin EMI Records singles
Number-one singles in Sweden
Torch songs
Songs written by MNEK
Songs written by Zara Larsson
Epic Records singles
2015 songs
Male–female vocal duets
Music videos shot in Iceland